Samir Qasimi (Arabic: سمير قسيمي) (born 1974) is a critically acclaimed Algerian writer.

He has published four novels:

 The Loss of a Permit (2009)
 A Great Day to Die (2009)
 Infertile Woman in Love (2012)   
 The Stairs of Trolar (2019)

He has been long-listed twice for the International Prize for Arabic Fiction, first for A Great Day to Die in 2010 and secondly for The Stairs of Trolar in 2020.

References

1974 births
People from Algiers
Algerian novelists
Living people
21st-century Algerian people